The 2001 1. divisjon, Norway's second-tier football league, began on 21 April 2001 and ended on 28 October 2001. The league was contested by 16 teams, and the top two teams won promotion to Tippeligaen, while the third place team played a promotion-playoff against the 12th-placed team in Tippeligaen to win promotion. The bottom four teams were relegated to the 2. divisjon.

Team changes from 2000
2000 1. divisjon champions FK Lyn and runners-up Strømsgodset were promoted to the 2001 Tippeligaen. They were replaced by Start and Haugesund, who finished 13th and 14th respectively in the 2000 Tippeligaen season.

Due to the enlargement from 14 to 16 teams in 2001, only two teams, Strindheim and Eik-Tønsberg, were relegated to the 2001 2. divisjon following the 2000 season. They were replaced by 2000 2. divisjon play-off winners Mandalskameratene, Ørn-Horten, Hødd and Aalesund. Mandalskameratene made their first appearance at the second tier since 1952–53.

One further spots were available through relegation/promotion play-offs. Sogndal successfully promoted to Tippeligaen by beating Tippeligaen side Vålerenga on away goals (3–3 on aggregate) in the Tippeligaen play-off, sending the team from Oslo to the second tier of Norwegian football.

Season summary
Vålerenga and Start won promotion to Tippeligaen, after only one season in the First Division, while Ham-Kam lost the promotion-playoff against Bryne. Mandalskameratene, Kongsvinger, Kjelsås and Byåsen were relegated to the 2. divisjon.

In the decisive match of the season, Ørn-Horten scored twice in the stoppage time in the match against Vålerenga. Ørn-Horten's goalkeeper Helge Fjeld scored the winning goal five minutes into stoppage time, and kept Ørn-Horten clear of relegation, at the expense of Mandalskameratene.

Bala Garba and Marino Rahmberg became top goalscorers with 18 goals each.

League table

Statistics

Top goalscorers

References

Norwegian First Division seasons
2
Norway
Norway